Thomas Robert Kahnle (born August 7, 1989) is an American professional baseball pitcher for the New York Yankees of Major League Baseball (MLB). He has previously played in MLB for the Colorado Rockies, Chicago White Sox, and Los Angeles Dodgers.

Amateur career
Kahnle played high school baseball at Shaker High School in Latham, New York, and college baseball at Lynn University in Boca Raton, Florida. In 2009, he played collegiate summer baseball with the Orleans Firebirds of the Cape Cod Baseball League, and returned to the league in 2010, splitting his time between the Bourne Braves and the Brewster Whitecaps.

Professional career

Minor leagues (2010–2013)
The New York Yankees selected Kahnle in the fifth round of the 2010 Major League Baseball draft. He made his professional debut for the Staten Island Yankees in 2010. He appeared in 11 games and had a 0.56 earned run average and 25 strikeouts over 16 innings pitched. He played for the Charleston RiverDogs in 2011, recording a 4.22 ERA and 112 strikeouts over 81 innings. He spent the 2012 season between the Tampa Yankees and Trenton Thunder. He had a 2.37 ERA with 74 strikeouts in 57 innings.

The Yankees invited Kahnle to spring training in 2013. He was an Eastern League All-Star in 2013 and finished the season with a 2.85 ERA and 74 strikeouts over 60 innings.

Colorado Rockies (2014–2015)
The Colorado Rockies selected Kahnle from the Yankees in the 2013 Rule 5 Draft. He opened the 2014 season on the Rockies' Opening Day roster, and made his major league debut on April 3. He would finish the season appearing in 54 games with a 4.19 ERA in 68-plus innings. The following season, Kahnle spent half the season in the minors, only appearing in 36 games for the Rockies while recording two saves. Kahnle was designated for assignment following the 2015 season.

Chicago White Sox (2016–2017)
The Rockies traded Kahnle to the Chicago White Sox for Yency Almonte on November 24, 2015. In his first season with the White Sox, Kahnle had a 2.63 ERA with 25 strikeouts and 21 walks in  innings pitched. He started the 2017 season pitching to a 2.50 ERA with 60 strikeouts and seven walks in 36 innings.

New York Yankees (2017–2020)
On July 18, 2017, the White Sox traded Kahnle, Todd Frazier, and David Robertson to the New York Yankees for Blake Rutherford, Tyler Clippard, Ian Clarkin, and Tito Polo. On August 24, 2017, Kahnle was ejected for the first time in his career after throwing a pitch behind Miguel Cabrera, leading up to Joe Girardi's ejection and an altercation between Austin Romine and Cabrera, triggering a bench-clearing brawl. On June 4, 2018, the Yankees optioned Kahnle to their Triple-A affiliate, the Scranton/Wilkes-Barre RailRiders, as Adam Warren was activated from the 10-day disabled list. Kahnle was recalled from the RailRiders on August 16 and recorded his first save of the 2018 season on August 21 against the Miami Marlins, replacing Aroldis Chapman in the top of the 12th inning after Chapman was removed due to knee pain.

In 2018, Kahnle posted a 6.56 ERA in 24 games for the New York Yankees.

In 2019, Kahnle was awarded the reliever of the month for the American League in the month of July 2019. He posted a 0.77 ERA in 12 games in July, striking out 17 batters while not surrendering a homer. He allowed just one run and five hits, walking two batters.

On July 31, 2020, Kahnle had an MRI that revealed a damaged ulnar collateral ligament of the elbow. He underwent Tommy John surgery the next week, which ended his 2020 season. On October 31, 2020, Kahnle was outrighted off of the 40-man roster and elected free agency.

Los Angeles Dodgers (2021–2022)
On December 29, 2020, Kahnle signed a two-year contract with the Los Angeles Dodgers. After missing the entire 2021 season while rehabbing his injuries, Kahnle made his Dodgers debut on May 1, 2022. However, after pitching in four games, he went on the injured list with right forearm inflammation in May. He didn't return until mid-September. In 13 games, he pitched in  innings, allowing four runs on five hits (two home runs) for a 2.84 ERA.

New York Yankees (second stint)
On December 21, 2022, Kahnle signed a two-year contract to return to the New York Yankees.

Personal life
Kahnle and his wife Veronica married in 2016.

See also
Rule 5 draft results

References

External links

1989 births
Living people
People from Latham, New York
Baseball players from New York (state)
Major League Baseball pitchers
Colorado Rockies players
Chicago White Sox players
New York Yankees players
Los Angeles Dodgers players
Lynn Fighting Knights baseball players
Brewster Whitecaps players
Bourne Braves players
Orleans Firebirds players
Staten Island Yankees players
Charleston RiverDogs players
Tampa Yankees players
Trenton Thunder players
Albuquerque Isotopes players
Charlotte Knights players
Twitch (service) streamers
Rancho Cucamonga Quakes players
Oklahoma City Dodgers players